The Centrist Democratic Party of the Philippines (CDP) is a Christian democratic party in the Philippines. Created in 2010, it is headed by Cagayan de Oro representative Rufus Rodriguez. The party aims to "institutionalize an alternative to patronage-oriented political parties".

History
The party recognizes Senators Manuel Manahan and Raul Manglapus as the earliest proponents of Christian democracy in the Philippines. The party also recognizes Ninoy Aquino and Aquilino Pimentel, Jr as primary proponents of the ideology in the country. Lito Monico Lorenzana, one of the members of the cabinet of President Corazon Aquino, founded the Centrist Democratic Movement (CDM), that would eventually evolve into the CDP.

On September 12, 2012, the party was accredited by the Commission on Elections. A month later, the party, while not putting up candidates for the 2013 Senate election, announced that they are supporting the candidacies of Francis Escudero, Aquilino Pimentel III and Bam Aquino, all from Team PNoy. Newly-installed party leader Rufus Rodriguez remarked that the CDP has a "real ideology" unlike other parties, while Lorenzana claimed not to be beholden to anyone, and abhorred patronage politics. Aside from supporting three senatorial candidates, the party has 74 candidates for lower positions.

In its campaign for the 2013 elections, the party started a road show for constitutional reform or charter change (Cha-cha). Rodriguez, who is a proponent of charter change, had earlier written a House of Representatives resolution calling for a shift to federalism, return to a two-party system, regional or state election of senators, amendment of the presidential term of office to four years with one reelection and a four-year term with no term limits for local officials, and lifting of nationalist economic provisions in the constitution.

In the 2016 local elections in the town of Salcedo, Eastern Samar, Melchor Llego Mergal ran for mayor under the CDP (as a guest candidate of the Liberal Party/Koalisyon ng Daang Matuwid and the Coalition for Change/Kilusang Pagbabago) with Maricris "Utay" Duran Fabillar and won. Mergal and Duran eventually became the party's highest-ranking officials.

Electoral performance

Presidential and vice presidential elections

Senate 
The CDP has never put up candidates for the Senate but has endorsed candidates from other parties.

House of Representatives 
Party president Rufus Rodriguez, the representative from Cagayan de Oro's 2nd congressional district. consistently holds the party's sole seat in the House of Representatives.

References

Centrist parties in the Philippines
Liberal parties in the Philippines
Political parties established in 2010
Christian democratic parties in Asia